Sidney Arthur Fraleigh (born 5 February 1931) is a former Progressive Conservative party member of the House of Commons of Canada. Born in Forest, Ontario, Fraleigh is a farmer by career.

He was the son of Sidney Anderson Fraleigh and was educated at the University of Guelph. In 1953, Fraleigh married Velma Eloise Minielly. He served as a member of the council for Bosanquet Township and was also chairman of the board for the Ontario Pork Producers Marketing Board.

Fraleigh won the seat for the Lambton—Middlesex electoral district in the 1979 federal election but lost there in the 1980 federal election to Ralph Ferguson of the Liberal party. He regained the seat in 1984, but lost again to Ferguson in the 1988 federal election. Fraleigh thus served in the 31st and 33rd Canadian Parliaments.

References 
 Canadian Parliamentary Guide, 1987, PG Normandin

External links
 

1931 births
Living people
Members of the House of Commons of Canada from Ontario
Progressive Conservative Party of Canada MPs